The 1998 Greenwich Council election took place on 7 May 1998 to elect members of Greenwich Council in London, England. The whole council was up for election and the Labour party stayed in overall control of the council.

The election saw a number of independent candidates contest seats and the election saw candidates standing as Greens against the Millennium Dome, Conservatives Against Town Hall Corruption, Populist Keep Our Pound and the Corrective Party. However the Labour party was always seen as highly likely to remain in control of the council.

At the same as the election Greenwich saw 74.8% vote in favour of the 1998 Greater London Authority referendum and 25.2% against, on a 32.4% turnout.

Election result

Ward results

References

1998 London Borough council elections
1998
May 1998 events in the United Kingdom